The United African National Council (UANC) is a political party in Zimbabwe. It was briefly the ruling party during 1979–1980, when its leader Abel Muzorewa was Prime Minister.

History
The party was founded by Muzorewa in 1971. Running as African National Council independents, it won six of the eight African seats in the House of Assembly in the 1974 general elections. The party was renamed the United African National Council in 1977, but did not contest the 1977 general elections.

Following the Internal Settlement of 1978, the party won the 1979 elections, winning 51 of the 100 seats, resulting in Muzorewa becoming Prime Minister. However, the new government failed to win international recognition due to its exclusion of the African nationalist ZAPU and ZANU in negotiations and following the Lancaster House Agreement, early elections were held in April 1980. The UANC won only three seats as ZANU–PF took power.

After failing to win a seat in the 1985 and 1990 elections, the party joined with other opposition parties to form United Parties to support Muzorewa in the 1996 presidential election, but he subsequently pulled out (albeit with his name remaining on the ballot). United Parties also unsuccessfully contested the 2000 parliamentary elections.

The party contested the 2018 general elections but received just 1,889	votes.

References

Political parties in Rhodesia
Political parties in Zimbabwe
1971 establishments in Rhodesia
Political parties established in 1971